The Paradelta Bora is an Italian single-place paraglider, designed and produced by Paradelta Parma of Parma. It  remained in production in 2016 as the Bora 2.

Design and development
The Bora was designed as an intermediate glider. The models are each named for their approximate wing area in square metres.

The improved Bora 2 was introduced in 2003 and remained in production in 2016.

Reviewer Noel Bertrand noted the Bora 2's introduction in 2003, writing, "this elegant wing, like all high performance wings, has triple cells with diagonal cell bracing and thin section lines".

Variants
Bora 2-24
Small-sized model for lighter pilots. The glider is AFNOR certified.
Bora 2-26
Large-sized model for heavier pilots. The glider is AFNOR certified.

Specifications (Bora 2-26)

References

External links
Bora official page
Bora 2 official page

Bora
Paragliders